Elisha Netanyahu (December 21, 1912 – April 3, 1986) was an Israeli mathematician specializing in complex analysis. Over the course of his work at the Technion he was the Dean of the Faculty of Sciences and established the separate Department of Mathematics. Historian Benzion Netanyahu was his brother, while current Israeli Prime Minister Benjamin Netanyahu is his nephew.

Biography
Netanyahu was born in Warsaw, Poland, to the writer and Zionist activist Nathan Mileikowsky. He was the third of nine children. In 1920 the family made aliyah to the Land of Israel. The family eventually settled in Jerusalem and adopted Hebrew name Netanyahu.

Netanyahu went to the Reali School in Haifa, from which he graduated in 1930. He later returned to Reali in 1935 to teach mathematics there. He studied at the Hebrew University of Jerusalem, from which he received his BS, MA and PhD (1942). His advisors were Michael Fekete and Binyamin Amirà. After the graduation he joined the British Army as a volunteer, serving in Egypt and then in Italy as an officer in a unit of the Royal Engineering Corps. He specialized in preparation of maps, which he continued to do during the 1948 Arab–Israeli War.

After he was demobilized in 1946, he became a lecturer at the Technion. He rose to a professor in 1958, and later became the head of the Mathematics Section, then as Dean of the Faculty of Sciences. His administrative efforts also played an important role towards establishment of the Ben-Gurion University of the Negev.

He had long term visits at Stanford University (1953–54), NYU (1961), the University of New Mexico (1969), the University of Maryland, College Park (1973), and ETH Zürich (1979). In 1980, Netanyahu retired from the Technion and moved to Jerusalem, where he died of cancer in 1986.

Throughout his long career, Netanyahu collaborated with Paul Erdős, Charles Loewner and other leading mathematicians, continuing and expanding the analytical traditions at the Technion.

Personal life
In 1949 Netanyahu married Shoshana Shenburg, his former student at the Reali, who later became the second female justice at the Israel Supreme Court. They had two children: Nathan (b. 1951), a professor of computer science at Bar-Ilan University, and Dan (b. 1954), an information systems auditor.

Elisha Netanyahu Memorial Lectures
The Elisha Netanyahu Memorial Lecture Series was established by the Netanyahu family and the Technion to honor the memory in 1987 with the first lecture by Paul Erdős. In other years, the speakers included Lars Ahlfors, Robert Aumann, Lipman Bers, Enrico Bombieri, Charles Fefferman, Samuel Karlin, David Kazhdan, Louis Nirenberg, Terence Tao, Wendelin Werner, and Don Zagier.

References
 J.M. Anderson, "Obituary: Elisha Netanyahu", Bull. London Math. Soc. 20 (1988), no. 6, 613–618.
 Lawrence Zalcman, In memoriam Elisha Netanyahu 1912–1986, Journal d'Analyse Mathématique, vol. 60:1 (December 1993), pp. 1–10.
 Elisha Netanyahu Memorial Lectures

1912 births
1986 deaths
20th-century  Israeli mathematicians
Einstein Institute of Mathematics alumni
Jewish scientists
Mathematical analysts
Elisha
Polish emigrants to Mandatory Palestine
New York University faculty
20th-century Polish Jews
Scientists from Haifa
Scientists from Jerusalem
Academic staff of Technion – Israel Institute of Technology